Sparta is a city and municipality in Laconia, Greece. It lies at the site of ancient Sparta. The municipality was merged with six nearby municipalities in 2011, for a total population (as of 2011) of 35,259, of whom 17,408 lived in the city.

History

Beginning in the 13th century, the political and cultural center of Laconia shifted to Mystras, some 4 km to the west.
The settlement at ancient Sparta, named Lacedaemonia, continued to exist, although greatly depopulated, until modern times as a town of a few thousand people who lived among the ruins, in the shadow of Mystras. The Palaiologos family (the last Byzantine Greek imperial dynasty) also lived in Mystras. The Despotate of the Morea was captured by the Ottomans under Mehmed II in 1460.

In 1834, after the Greek War of Independence, King Otto of Greece decreed the town should be expanded into a city. Modern day Sparta, the capital of the prefecture of Lakonia, lies on the eastern foothills of Mount Taygetos in the Evrotas River valley. The city has been built upon the site of ancient Sparta, whose Acropolis lies north of the modern city. To the southwest stands Mt. Taygetos. To the east of the city stands the Parnonas mountain range, which is forested predominantly with Greek fir trees and other conifers.

Modern Sparta's origins date back to October 20, 1834, when King Otto issued a decree on the construction of the new city. Bavarian city planners, headed by Fr. Stauffert, designed a city of 100,000 inhabitants based on the neo-classical architectural model.

Today Sparta maintains its good design, boasting large squares and wide streets lined with trees, while many of the older buildings remain in excellent condition. The city of Sparta is the economic, administrative and cultural center of Lakonia. A key factor in the advancement of the city's development is the operation of two departments of the University of Peloponnese and a department of the Technological Educational Institute.

The centrally located main square is dominated by the most imposing neo-classical building in Sparta, the City Hall.  Built in 1909, City Hall bears the signature of the Greek architect G. Katsaros. During the monarchy (which was abolished by referendum in 1973), the title of Duke of Sparta was used for the Greek crown prince, the διάδοχος (diádokhos).

Municipality

The municipality of Sparta was formed at the 2011 local government reform by the merger of the following seven former municipalities, that became municipal units:

Faris
Karyes
Mystras
Oinountas
Pellana
Sparta
Therapnes

The municipality has an area of 1,181.780 km2, the municipal unit 84.453 km2. The municipal unit consists of the local communities Sparta, Afisi, Amykles, Kalyvia Sochas and Kladas.

Politics

Sparta is regarded as one of the most conservative cities in Greece; it has never had a left-wing mayor and it was one of the few cities that voted in 1974 to retain the monarchy. Laconia was the region with the highest proportion of "yes" votes (which was supported by the conservative party) in the 2015 bailout referendum.

Demographics

Climate
The city of Sparta enjoys a sunny and warm Mediterranean climate (Köppen Csa). Winters are mild and cool, while summers tend to be particularly hot. Sparta registers the highest summer average maximum temperatures in Greece and is notorious for its scorching summer heat.

Tourism

Main sites

In the center of the city is the Archaeological Museum. Built by architect G. Katsaros, 
in 1874–76 to house the collection of local archaeological finds by Panagiotis Stamatakis, it was the first Greek museum in a provincial city.

The city's cathedral is at the southwest end.

The ruins of ancient Sparta lie north of the city. Entering by the South Gate of the Acropolis, known as Lakedaemonia, there is the Rotunda, the Theatre and the Temple of Athena Chalkioikos to the West. Exiting the Acropolis by the North Gate there are the remains of the earliest ancient walls, the Heroon and the Altar of Lycourgos, whereas to the East there is the Sanctuary of Artemis Orthia. To the North is the   Monastic Church of Osios Nikonas (10th century).

The "Tomb of Leonidas", or Leonidaion, is a limestone structure of the  late 5th century BC, likely a temple, but named for Leonidas I in the 19th century, being the only ancient monument indicated within the limits of the newly-planned town in 1834.

Museums
Archaeological Museum of Sparta
 The Museum of the Olive and Greek Olive Oil in the South West end highlights the culture of the olive and the technology of olive production, 129 Othonos–Amalias Street 
 Archaeological Museum of Mystras, founded by Gabriel Lilianthal in the late 19th century
 The Manousakeio Museum of urban and folk life 
 Koumantareios Art Gallery of Sparta 
 Angakis Art Gallery

Sports
The Spartathlon has taken place every September since 1983. It is an ultramarathon starting in Athens and finishing in Sparta at the statue of Leonidas, with many international participants.

The local football club was Sparta F.C.

People
 Babis Petrakos, footballer
 Nikiforos Vrettakos, writer

Twin towns – sister cities

Sparta is twinned with:

 Brunswick (Melbourne), Australia
 Lapithos, Cyprus
 Morphou, Cyprus
 Le Plessis-Trévise, France
 Sopron, Hungary
 Stamford, United States
 Tanagura, Japan
 Taranto, Italy
 Salamanca, Spain

References

External links 

Laconia.org
Official website Sparta municipality 

Sparta
Municipalities of Peloponnese (region)
Populated places in Laconia
Greek prefectural capitals
1834 establishments in Europe
Planned cities in Greece